Fining may refer to:

 Finings, additives to beer or wine, see also fining
 Fining, metallurgy process done in a finery forge
 Fining, glass production process, also called refining

See also
Fine (disambiguation)
 Finery (disambiguation)